Major Ralph George Campbell Glyn, 1st Baron Glyn, Bt, MC, DL (3 March 1884 – 1 May 1960), known as Sir Ralph Glyn, 1st Baronet, from 1934 to 1953, was a soldier and Conservative Party politician in the United Kingdom. He was a Member of Parliament (MP) from 1918 to 1922, and from 1924 to 1953.

Early life
Glyn was born on 3 March 1884 to Edward Glyn, Bishop of Peterborough and Lady Emma Mary, daughter of George Campbell, 8th Duke of Argyll. His father was the younger son of George Glyn, 1st Baron Wolverton. He was educated at Wixenford, Harrow, and the Royal Military College, Sandhurst.

Career

Military service
Glyn fought in the First World War, during which he was mentioned in despatches and was awarded the Military Cross.

Political career
At the 1918 general election, Glyn was elected as Unionist MP for the Scottish constituency of Clackmannan and Eastern Stirlingshire. However he lost the seat at the 1922 general election, coming third with 28% of the votes. The following year, at the 1923 general election, Glyn stood in the Conservative-held seat of Abingdon, where the MP Arthur Loyd was not standing again. Lloyd's majority in 1922 had been only 640 votes, and Glyn lost by 254 votes (1.2% of the total) to the Liberal candidate Edward Lessing.

However, at the 1924 general election, Glyn substantially increased his vote, and won the seat with a majority of over 4,000 votes.  He represented the constituency for nearly thirty years, and was returned unopposed at the 1931 election and at the 1935 election. He was made a baronet 21 January 1934, of Farnborough Downs, in the County of Berkshire, and in 1953 he was elevated to the peerage as Baron Glyn, of Farnborough in the County of Berkshire.

Personal life
Lord Glyn married Sibell Vanden Bempde-Johnstone, daughter of Francis Vanden-Bempde-Johnstone, 2nd Baron Derwent and widow of Brigadier-General Walter Long, in 1921. She was the mother of Walter Long, 2nd Viscount Long. There were no children from the marriage. Lady Glyn died in 1958. Lord Glyn survived her by two years and died in Oxfordshire in 1960, aged 75, when the baronetcy and barony became extinct.

Glyn was on the governing body of Abingdon School from 1924 to 1952 and again from 1955 to 1960 in addition to be the vice-chairman of the Governors from 1958 until his death in 1960. and the Mayor of Abingdon.

Arms

Notes

References

External links 
 

  serving alongside John Worthington (1931–1935)  and Frank Markham (1931–1932)

1884 births
1960 deaths
People educated at Harrow School
People educated at Wixenford School
Members of the Parliament of the United Kingdom for Stirling constituencies
UK MPs 1918–1922
Conservative Party (UK) MPs for English constituencies
UK MPs 1924–1929
UK MPs 1929–1931
UK MPs 1931–1935
UK MPs 1935–1945
UK MPs 1945–1950
UK MPs 1950–1951
UK MPs 1951–1955
UK MPs who were granted peerages
Parliamentary Private Secretaries to the Prime Minister
Ralph
Unionist Party (Scotland) MPs
Governors of Abingdon School
Hereditary barons created by Elizabeth II